is a railway station in Miyoshi, Hiroshima, Japan, operated by West Japan Railway Company (JR West). Along with Niimi and Tsuyama Stations, Miyoshi is one of the major central region stations in the Chūgoku region of Japan.

Lines 
Miyoshi Station is served by the Geibi Line and Fukuen Line, and is the terminal station for the Fukuen Line.

It was also the terminal station for the Sankō Line before the line ceased operation on 31 March 2018.

Station layout

Miyoshi Station is a reinforced concrete two-story building, operated by JR West. It features two platforms which handle four lines: one platform next to the station building and an island platform accessible via an enclosed footbridge above the tracks. The station building houses a small convenience store as well as automatic ticket vending machines and a "Midori no Madoguchi" staffed ticket office. There is a large waiting area inside the station building, as well as enclosed and unenclosed waiting areas on the platforms.

Platforms
Platform 2: Geibi Line (for Hiroshima or Niimi), Fukuen Line (for Fuchū)
Platform 3: Geibi Line (for Hiroshima or Niimi), Fukuen Line (for Fuchū)

Adjacent stations

History
The station opened on 1 June 1933, initially named . On 10 December 1954, the station was renamed Miyoshi. With the privatization of Japanese National Railways (JNR) on 1 April 1987, the station came under the control of JR West.

The turntable located next to the station was sold to the private railway operator Tobu Railway in 2016, and installed next to Kinugawa-Onsen Station in Tochigi Prefecture for use by steam-hauled tourist trains.

The station was a terminal station of the Sankō Line. On 16 October 2015, JR West announced that it was considering closing the Sankō Line due to poor patronage. On 29 September 2016, JR West announced that the entire rail line would close on 31 March 2018. The line then closed on March 31, 2018, with an event hosted by JR West and will be replaced by a bus service.

Surrounding area
 Miyoshi Post Office
 Miyoshi CC Plaza shopping center
 Sungreen shopping center
 Miyoshi Municipal Tōkaichi Junior High School
 Miyoshi Municipal Tōkaichi Elementary School
 Basen River
 Gōno River
 Chūgoku Expressway Miyoshi Interchange

See also
 List of railway stations in Japan

References

External links

 JR West station information 

Railway stations in Hiroshima Prefecture
Fukuen Line
Geibi Line
Sankō Line
Railway stations in Japan opened in 1933